Acey may refer to:

Acey Abbey, former Cistercian abbey in Jura, France
Acey-deucey, backgammon variant
Acey (name)
The callsign for ExpressJet Airlines and aha!, and formerly Atlantic Southeast Airlines.